Tenaha may refer to:

Tenaha, Texas
Tenaha, Mauritania